Gold & Youth are an indie rock and electronic band based in Vancouver and Toronto. Signed to Arts & Crafts in 2011, they released their debut album titled Beyond Wilderness on May 14, 2013. The release of their debut record has garnered them significant critical acclaim, particularly in the UK.

History
The band was formed by Matthew Lyall, Murray Mckenzie and Jeff Mitchelmore in 2011 after the demise of their previous project The Racoons. Arts & Crafts announced the signing of Gold & Youth in early 2012, along with the debut of their first single Time To Kill. At this time it was also announced that Louise Burns had joined the band as a permanent member, having previously provided guest vocals on several recordings as well as lead vocals on their third single titled Jewel. The band spent 2012 finishing the recording of their debut record Beyond Wilderness as well as making early international festival appearances at SXSW, The Great Escape, NXNE, CMW, and Big Sound (Australia), with their live appearances garnering critical acclaim from NME and The Guardian.

In November 2012 they released their first EP, a 7-inch single featuring the singles Time to Kill and City of Quartz to positive critical acclaim coinciding with a national tour of Canada with Diamond Rings. In March 2013, the band released their third single Jewel and announced the release date of May 14, 2013 for their debut album Beyond Wilderness.

They selected their name upon suggestion from fellow Canadian musician Buck 65. The name itself is a same-sounding (homophonous) phrase with: Golden Youth, a character from the Mad Max film series.

The band posted a series of updates to their social media in 2020 stating they are working on a new record.

On August 27, 2021, the band released a new single "The Worse The Better" and announced their sophomore record Dream Baby would be released November 5, 2021 through Paper Bag Records. The single "Maudlin Days (Robocop)" was released September 22, 2021, and the single "Dying In LA" followed on October 13, 2021.

Beyond Wilderness

Gold & Youth's first full-length record, titled Beyond Wilderness, was released internationally on May 14, 2013, by Arts & Crafts and EMI. The album was produced and recorded by Colin Stewart (Black Mountain, New Pornographers, Destroyer) and mixed by Gareth Jones (Depeche Mode, Interpol, Grizzly Bear) and Damian Taylor (Björk, Robyn, Arcade Fire). According to the official band bio, the album is "built with dark, expansive synthetic textures, punctuated by programmed drums and interwoven with melancholy vocals, detuned synth melodies and understated guitars".

Members

Current members
Matthew Lyall – guitar, keyboards, vocals
Jeff Mitchelmore – drums, Drum sequencer
Murray Mckenzie – guitar, keyboards, vocals
Louise Burns – bass guitar, vocals, Synthesizer

Former members
Ted Gowans – bass guitar, keyboards backing vocals

Discography

Albums
Beyond Wilderness (Arts & Crafts / EMI) – May 14, 2013
Dream Baby (Paper Bag Records) – November 5, 2021

EPs
Time to Kill/City of Quartz (Arts & Crafts / EMI) - Nov 17, 2012

Singles
Time to Kill (Arts & Crafts / EMI) - February 28, 2012
City of Quartz (Arts & Crafts / EMI) - October 15, 2012
Jewel (Arts & Crafts / EMI) - March 5, 2013
The Worse The Better (Paper Bag Records) - August 27, 2021
Maudlin Days (Robocop) (Paper Bag Records) - September 22, 2021
Dying In LA (Paper Bag Records) - October 13, 2021

Compilation appearances
 Arts & Crafts Record Store Day LP (Arts & Crafts / EMI) - April 21, 2012

See also

Music of Canada
Canadian rock
List of bands from Canada
List of Canadian musicians
:Category:Canadian musical groups

References

External links
 Gold & Youth official website
Arts & Crafts Website Label Site

Musical groups established in 2011
Canadian indie rock groups
Musical groups from Vancouver
Arts & Crafts Productions artists
2011 establishments in British Columbia